Peter Geyer (born 11 December 1952 in Nuremberg) is a retired German football player. He spent nine seasons in the Bundesliga with Tennis Borussia Berlin, Borussia Dortmund and Eintracht Braunschweig. The best league result he achieved was sixth place.

References

External links 
 
 Peter Geyer at glubberer.de 

1952 births
Living people
Footballers from Nuremberg
German footballers
Germany B international footballers
Association football forwards
Bundesliga players
2. Bundesliga players
1. FC Nürnberg players
Tennis Borussia Berlin players
Borussia Dortmund players
Eintracht Braunschweig players
20th-century German people